The Ghostly Trio (consisting of Stretch, Fatso, and Stinkie, formerly Fatso, Fusso, and Lazo) are fictional characters appearing in Harvey Comics. They are well known for being the uncles of Casper the Friendly Ghost. Their first animated appearance was in The Friendly Ghost, a cartoon of Paramount Pictures' Famous Studios theatrical series from the 1940s. When Casper was translated to Harvey Comics, the characters were redesigned to make them more mischievous than terror-inspiring. The characters made numerous Harvey Comics appearances and were featured in the title Casper and the Ghostly Trio. Versions of the Ghostly Trio remained prominent in subsequent adaptations/spin-offs.

Description
Originally, Casper was featured on the show with ghost relatives who looked similar and liked to scare people. These relatives did not appear to have special traits or serve any other purpose. In Casper's earlier appearances in Harvey's animated cartoons and comic books, the Ghostly Trio were depicted differently, although they were brothers. Similar to his later incarnation, Fatso was overweight and gluttonous (although, as ghosts were capable of eating in the early stories, this trait was not as odd as it later seemed). He was the Trio's leader, as the toughest and (marginally) smartest of the three. Fatso's "second-in-command", Fusso, was portrayed as average in height and build and was characterized by exceptional fussiness and attention-to-detail. The third ghost, Lazo, was the tallest, laziest and least intelligent. Fatso's brashness and quick temper often led him into mishaps, as well as an occasional role in one of Casper's adventures; Fusso and Lazo were sometimes called "the Ghostly Duo" in his absence. The names don't seem set in stone; in "The Missing Haunts", their names are Eeko, Stretcho, and Fatso.

Film versions
Since the 1995 Casper feature film, the Ghostly Trio's names have mostly remained Stretch, Fatso and Stinkie. In most appearances, they enjoy scaring people (in contrast with Casper). The group generally treats Casper as its own personal slave and mistreats him. Despite this though, the Trio does truly care about Casper and like him more than they’re willing to admit and, on rare occasions, they even protect him, sometimes out of self-interest. Notably in the 2006 TV-movie, Casper's Scare School, depicts the Ghostly Trio as uncharacteristically nice towards Casper and the brothers display concern for him. For example, when Casper leaves for Scare School, the Trio cry.

Most of the time, the Ghostly Trio expresses a general feeling of superiority towards the living, sometimes degenerating into hatred, and, in the movies from 1995 onwards, sometimes refers to humans as either "fleshies" or "bonebags". The 1995 film and spin-off cartoon series, however, show their friendship with Dr. James Harvey (Bill Pullman). At first, they demand he vacate their home and make his quest to learn about the afterlife difficult. They grow to like him and, certain that his obsession with finding his wife will make him become a ghost, consider expanding their group into a Ghostly Quartet (or Quar-dead in Stretch's terms). Of course, that would require killing him, but they ultimately prove unable to do it themselves. (Harvey later dies in a manhole accident, but this proves temporary.) After he stops trying to get them to cross over, they also keep their promise to briefly reuniting him with the spirit of his wife. The spin-off cartoon depicted them in a similar light, where they often harass the doctor, although out of mischief rather than hatred.

Stretch
Stretch is the lanky leader of the Trio with a thick Boston accent. Stretch is the most aggressive at scaring the living by morphing his body; however he is said to be highly experienced at possession. Although he acts the harshest, he is soon revealed to have a soft spot, and is perhaps the most sensible in making important decisions. In a deleted song he claims to be schizoid-paranoid, and despite his intelligence, he can be very childish at times.

Fatso
Fatso is obese and assumed to be the least intelligent, even though he is adept at singing and has a surprisingly strong knowledge of pop culture. He also has a huge appetite for food, regardless of the fact that it literally drifts through his body, constantly overeating and seems to be the most emotional. He treats Casper the same as Stretch and Stinkie, but can easily be manipulated. When Stretch and Stinkie ask about something relevant to a story, a running gag has Fatso asking about something unrelated.

Stinkie
Stinkie is the "middle child" and dubbed the "Larry Fine" of the group. Stinkie's special talent involves supernatural halitosis and body odor, which he prefers as his means of frightening "fleshies" who cross his path (sometimes announcing this by saying "Smell-o-gram!"). He has a penchant for puns and comedy and comes off as the sarcastic jokester, which Stretch tires of more often than not. Casper's Haunted Christmas shows his interest in modern technology. In the 1995 film, he is portrayed as quieter and more timid than Stretch or Fatso, as reflected by his friendlier face on the film's poster.

Ghostbusters comparison
Fatso's appearance, voice, and love for food makes him comparable to Slimer, an apparition from Ghostbusters. In 1987 Harvey Comics sued Columbia Pictures (the film's distributor) for $50 million, claiming that the iconic Ghostbusters logo was too reminiscent of Fatso. The court ruled in Columbia's favor, due to Harvey's failure to renew the copyrights on early Casper stories and the "limited ways to draw a figure of a cartoon ghost."

Relationship to Casper
Casper's exact relationship to the Ghostly Trio varies. In the early comic stories, the unfailingly polite Casper never addressed any of them as "Uncle," suggesting that they were instead his elder brothers or cousins.

Casper's Haunted Christmas hints at a relationship. The Ghostly Trio refer to Spooky (Casper's cousin) as their nephew. Whether or not that makes them blood relatives, remains unrevealed.

In the 1995 film and spin-off cartoon, they are said to be his uncles.

In the movie, Casper Meets Wendy, Casper tells Wendy that the Trio are his uncles. 

Casper: A Spirited Beginning, claims that Casper is not related to the Ghostly Trio, meeting them for the first time when he runs away from a ghost school run by the evil ghost Kibosh. Attempting to prove their superior ghost techniques, the Trio train Casper in his ghost abilities; when contacted by Kibosh and his assistant, Snivel, they lie to Kibosh about being his uncles so that he can remain in their care. Casper had saved the Trio from Kibosh's wrath after having impressed him when Casper ingested a bomb that saved the Trio's home from being destroyed. The Trio returned the favour by more or less adopting Casper so he would not have to go to scare school under Kibosh's orders, therefore remaining a family as Kibosh stated family stays together and haunts together.

Powers and abilities
The Ghostly Trio are shown to be a very powerful and experienced group of ghosts, and the trio has vast supernatural powers, such as intangibility, invisibility, teleportation, flight, possession (which they supposedly hold the record for the longest possessions), matter transmutation, shapeshifting and other forms of reality warping.

Actors 
Joe Nipote voiced Stretch, Joe Alaskey voiced Stinkie, and Brad Garrett voiced Fatso in the 1995 movie, Casper and its television series, The Spooktacular New Adventures of Casper, with Garrett being switched out with Jess Harnell in seasons 3 and 4.

Jim Ward voiced Stretch, Bill Farmer voiced Stinkie and Jess Harnell voiced Fatso in Casper: A Spirited Beginning and Casper Meets Wendy.

Scott McNeil voiced Stretch, Terry Klassen voiced Stinkie and Graeme Kingston voiced Fatso in Casper's Haunted Christmas.

Dan Castellaneta voiced Stretch, John DiMaggio voiced Stinkie and Billy West voiced Fatso in the 2006 TV-movie, Casper's Scare School, however, for the television show, Fatso is voiced by Joe Sheridan and Stinkie and Stretch are voiced by Matthew Géczy.

In Casper Meets Wendy, the Ghostly Trio possess three human men (for hours) at a dance party and end up flirting with the three witches, Wendy's aunts. Michael McDonald played Spike (Human Stretch), Travis McKenna played Phil (Human Fatso) and Patrick Richwood played Vince (Human Stinkie).

Friends
 Casper The Friendly Ghost
 Dr. James Harvey
 Kat Harvey (at times)
 Ms. Banshee
 Wendy the Good Little Witch and her aunts Thelma, Velma and Zelma (eventually)

Enemies
 Catherine "Carrigan" Crittenden
 Paul "Dibs" Plutzker
 Kibosh The Ghost
 Snivel The Ghost
 Desmond Spellman
 Vincent and Jules
 Casper The Friendly Ghost (sometimes)

Voice actors

See also
List of ghosts

References

External links
Ghostly Trio at Don Markstein's Toonopedia. Archived from the original on August 24, 2016.

Film characters introduced in 1945
Animated characters
Famous Studios series and characters
Harvey Comics series and characters
Fictional ghosts
Fictional trios
Casper characters
Shapeshifter characters in comics